USS LST-978 was an  in the United States Navy. Like many of her class, she was not named and is properly referred to by her hull designation.

Construction
LST-978 was laid down on 15 December 1944, at Hingham, Massachusetts, by the Bethlehem-Hingham Shipyard; launched on 20 January 1945; sponsored by Mrs. Anna H. Phelan; and commissioned on 15 February 1945.

Service history
Following World War II, LST-978 performed occupation duty in the Far East until mid-December 1945. She returned to the United States and was decommissioned on 6 June 1946, and struck from the Navy list on 3 July, that same year. On 10 December 1947, the ship was sold to the Salco Iron & Metal Co., for scrapping.

Notes

Citations

Bibliography 

Online resources

External links
 

 

LST-542-class tank landing ships
World War II amphibious warfare vessels of the United States
Ships built in Hingham, Massachusetts
1945 ships